Obaidullah is a cricketer from Bangladesh.  He played two first-class and two List A games for Sylhet Division in 2000/01.  His batting was not successful but he did take 2 for 39 against Barisal Division with the ball.

References

Bangladeshi cricketers
Sylhet Division cricketers
Living people
Year of birth missing (living people)